Steven Castle Kellogg (born October 26, 1941 in Norwalk, Connecticut) is an American author and illustrator who has created more than 90 children's books.

On November 12, 2011, Kellogg was given an honorary Doctor of Humane Letters from the University of Findlay in Ohio. All of his original illustrations were donated to the Mazza Museum of International Art from Picture Books at Findlay. The donation was made possible in part by a $350,000 gift by close friend, Anthony Edwards.  More than 2700 works of art were included.

Biography

He was born in Norwalk, Connecticut, to Robert E. and Hilma Marie (Johnson) Kellogg. His love of writing and illustrating  led to his being accepted at the Rhode Island School of Design. While a student, he won a scholarship to study abroad for a year in Italy.

Steven Kellogg is also a member of the Board of Directors of the National Children's Book and Literacy Alliance a national not-for-profit organization that advocates for literacy, literature, and libraries, where he serves as a vice-president.

In 1967, Kellogg married Helen Hill. Almost immediately, he began illustrating books by other authors, and soon afterwards wrote and illustrated his own titles. He lives in Essex, New York.

Kellogg is a winner of the Regina Medal for his lifetime contribution to children’s literature. His books have received a variety of awards, including being named Reading Rainbow featured selections and winning the Boston Globe-Horn Book Award, the Irma Simonton Black Award, the IRA-CBC Children’s Choice Award, and the Parents’ Choice Award.

Works

Kellogg's works showcase highly detailed pen and ink drawings that evolved to a singular style of watercolor and pen. His first children's book, "Gwot! and other horribly funny hair ticklers" written by George Mendoza, was published in 1967.

Author and Illustrator 
 The Wicked Kings of Bloon (1970)
 The Mystery Beast of Ostergeest (1971)
 Can I Keep Him? (1971)
 Much Bigger Than Martin (1971)
 Won't Somebody Play with Me? (1972)
 The Orchard Cat (1972)
 The Island of the Skog (1973)
 The Mystery of the Missing Red Mitten (1974)
 There Was an Old Woman (1974)
 Yankee Doodle (1976)
 The Mysterious Tadpole (1977)
 The Mystery of the Magic Green Ball (1978)
 Pinkerton, Behave! (1979)
 The Mystery of the Flying Orange Pumpkin (1980)
 A Rose for Pinkerton (1981)
 The Mystery of the Stolen Blue Paint (1982)
 Tallyho, Pinkerton! (1982)
 Ralph's Secret Weapon (1983)
 Paul Bunyan (1984)
 Chicken Little (1985)
 Best Friends (1986)
 Pecos Bill (1986)
 Prehistoric Pinkerton (1986)
 Aster Aardvark's Alphabet Adventures (1987)
 Johnny Appleseed (1988)
 The Big Book for Peace (1990)
 Jack and the Beanstalk (1991)
 Mike Fink (1992)
 The Christmas Witch (1992)
 Steven Kellogg's Super Spectacular 16-month Calendar: September 1993 - December 1994 (1993)
 The Three Little Pigs (1993)
 The Adventures of Huckleberry Finn (1994)
 Sally Ann Thunder Ann Whirlwind Crockett (1995)
 I Was Born About 10,000 Years Ago: A Tall Tale (1996)
 More Than Anything Else (1997)
 A-Hunting We Will Go! (1998)
 The Three Sillies (1999)
 Give the Dog a Bone (2000)
 The Missing Mitten Mystery (2000)
 Big Bear Ball (2001)
 A Penguin Pup for Pinkerton (2001)
 Pinkerton & Friends (2004)
 The Pied Piper's Magic (2009)
 And I Love You (2010)

Illustrator Only 
 The Baby Beebee Bird (1963)
 Gwot! Horribly Funny Hairticklers (1967)
 The Rotten Book (1969)
 Martha Matilda O'Toole (1969)
 Brave Johnny O'Hare (1969)
 Mister Rogers' Song Book (1970)
 Can't You Pretend? (1970)
 Mrs. Purdy's Children (1970)
 A Beasty Story (1970)
 Granny and the Desperadoes (1970)
 Matilda Who Told Lies (1970)
 Crabapple Night (1971)
 Here Comes Tagalong (1971)
 The Very Peculiar Tunnel (1972)
 The Castles of the Two Brothers (1972)
 Abby (1973)
 Come Here, Cat (1973)
 You Ought to See Herbert's House (1973)
 Kisses and Fishes (1974)
 The Great Christmas Kidnapping Caper (1974)
 Hilaire Belloc's The Yak, The Python, and the Frog: A Picture Book Production (1975)
 The Boy Who Was Followed Home (1975)
 How The Witch Got Alf (1975)
 The Smartest Bear and His Brother Oliver (1975)
 Awful Alexander (1976)
 Gustav the Gourmet Giant (1976)
 The Most Delicious Camping Trip Ever (1976)
 Steven Kellogg's Yankee Doodle (1976)
 Barney Bipple's Magic Dandelions (1977)
 Grouchy Uncle Otto (1977)
 Appelard and Liverwurst (1978)
 Millicent the Magnificent (1978)
 The Pickle Plan (1978)
 Jill the Pill (1979)
 Molly Moves Out (1979)
 Once, Said Darlene (1979)
 There's An Elephant in the Garage (1979)
 The Day Jimmy's Boa Ate the Wash (1980)
 Jimmy's Boa and the Bungee Jump Slam Dunk (1980)
 Uproar on Hollercat Hill (1980)
 Leo, Zack, and Emmie (1981)
 Liverwurst is Missing (1981)
 A Change of Plans (1982)
 Jimmy's Boa Bounces Back (1982)
 The Ten-Alarm Camp-Out (1983)
 A, My Name Is Alice (1984)
 The Steven Kellogg Connection (1985)
 How Much is a Million? (1985)
 Iva Dunnit and the Big Wind (1985)
 Leo, Zack, and Emmie Together Again (1987)
 Jimmy's Boa and the Big Splash Birthday Bash (1988)
 If You Made a Million (1989)
 Is Your Mama a Llama? (1989)
 The Day the Goose Got Loose (1990)
 Engelbert the Elephant (1990)
 Parents in the Pigpen, Pigs in the Tub (1992)
 The Great Quillow (1993)
 Library Lil (1993)
 The Wizard Next Door (1993)
 The Rattlebang Picnic (1994)
 Snuffles and Snouts (1995)
 Frogs Jump: A Counting Book (1996)
 Clorinda (2002)
 Millions to Measure (2003)
 Santa Claus Is Comin' to Town (2004)
 Clorinda Takes Flight (2005)
 If You Decide to Go to the Moon... (2005)
 The Invisible Moose (2005)
 Clorinda Plays Baseball! (2012)
 Farty Marty (2013)
 The Green Bath (2013)
 Snowflakes Fall (2013)

References

External links 

  Picture Books Author of the Month: Steven Kellogg (no date) at Greenville [ RI] Public Library
 

1941 births
Living people
American children's book illustrators
American children's writers
Rhode Island School of Design alumni
Writers from Norwalk, Connecticut